Cambridgeshire County Cricket Club played 28 List A cricket matches between 1964 and 2004. This is a list of the players who appeared in those matches.

Nick Adams, 10 matches, 1987–2001
Ajaz Akhtar, 16 matches, 1991–2004
David Bailey, 1 match, 1965 
David Baker, 3 matches, 1972–1982
Justin Benson, 1 match, 1986 
Ian Blanchett, 2 matches, 2001 
Mark Brown, 2 matches, 1982–1983
Martin Burton, 1 match, 1995 
Adrian Cade, 2 matches, 1991–1992
James Campbell-Ferguson, 2 matches, 1965–1967
Douglas Collard, 5 matches, 1975–1989
Darren Cousins, 1 match, 1999 
Denis Cousins, 1 match, 1972 
Edward Craig, 1 match, 1967 
Maurice Crouch, 1 match, 1964 
Andrew Cuthill, 1 match, 1987 
Edward Davis, 1 match, 1967 
Philip Dicks, 2 matches, 1988–1989
Bradleigh Donelan, 5 matches, 1995–1999
Cristian Durant, 7 matches, 1997–2001
Giles Ecclestone, 6 matches, 1992–2002
Simon Ecclestone, 1 match, 1992 
David Fairey, 6 matches, 1964–1975
Ian Flanagan, 2 matches, 2002–2004
Gary Freear, 4 matches, 2001–2004
Brian Gadsby, 5 matches, 1964-1972
Nigel Gadsby, 22 matches, 1982–2004
Mike Garnham, 3 matches, 1986–1988
Rex Gautrey, 4 matches, 1964–1967
Joe Grant, 1 match, 2004 
Cameron Green, 1 match, 1989 
Frank Griffith, 1 match, 2000 
Terry Hale, 4 matches, 1964–1967
John Harvey, 1 match, 1975 
Alan Hobbs, 1 match, 1965 
Dean Hoffman, 1 match, 1989 
David Holliday, 1 match, 1983 
Patrick Holman, 1 match, 1975 
Tony Howorth, 1 match, 1975 
Tom Huggins, 1 match, 2001 
John Jacklin, 1 match, 1975 
Terry Jenner, 1 match, 1972 
Christopher Jones, 3 matches, 2001–2004
Simon Kellett, 11 matches, 1996–2003
Aamer Khan, 2 matches, 2001 
Nasim Khan, 1 match, 2002 
Patrick Latham, 1 match, 1998 
Ian Lawrence, 4 matches, 1986–1989
Stewart Layton, 1 match, 2004 
Christopher Lethbridge, 2 matches, 1986–1987
David Lyon, 1 match, 1972 
Peter Malkin, 1 match, 1983 
John Mann, 1 match, 2004 
Mark Mason, 5 matches, 2000–2003
Kevin Masters, 1 match, 1996 
Gerald McDougall, 2 matches, 2002–2003
Michael McEvoy, 1 match, 1982 
Richard Merriman, 2 matches, 1991–1997
Geoffrey Miller, 3 matches, 1982–1986
Robert Milne, 2 matches, 1987–1991 
Saleem Mohammed, 6 matches, 1994–1999
David Norman, 7 matches, 1989–2000 
Jared Norman, 3 matches, 1998–2000
Martin Olley, 3 matches, 1991–1994
Ivor Parker, 1 match, 1982 
Matthew Parkinson, 1 match, 2000 
Derick Parry, 3 matches, 1982–1986
Adrian Pierson, 1 match, 1992 
Alan Ponder, 5 matches, 1967–1983
Robert Powell, 1 match, 2001 
Dominic Ralfs, 6 matches, 1994–1999
Paul Redfarn, 3 matches, 1983–1989
Vincent Reed, 1 match, 1975 
Gary Rice, 3 matches, 1982–1988
Bruce Roberts, 1 match, 1992 
Ed Rodgers, 1 match, 2003 
Robert Rollins, 4 matches, 2001–2003
Mark Saggers, 2 matches, 1982–1983
Tony Shippey, 5 matches, 1964–1972
Samuel Shippey, 2 matches, 1964–1967
Tim Smith, 11 matches, 1994–2004
Keith Steele, 1 match, 1972 
Martin Stephenson, 7 matches, 1972–1992
Peter Such, 1 match, 2002 
Pieter Swanepoel, 1 match, 2004 
Paul Swannell, 1 match, 2004 
Peter Swart, 1 match, 1975 
Alistair Tapp, 2 matches, 2000 
Kevin Thomas, 1 match, 1991 
Charles Thornely, 1 match, 1988 
Giles Toogood, 1 match, 1995 
Stuart Turner, 4 matches, 1987–1994
Douglas Vincent, 1 match, 1986 
Chris Walsh, 1 match, 2000 
Tim Walton, 1 match, 2001 
Johnny Wardle, 4 matches, 1964–1967
Christopher Whyborn, 1 match, 1997 
Simon Williams, 2 matches, 1995–1996
Alan Wilson, 4 matches, 1964–1967
Danny Wilson, 5 matches, 2000–2001
Elliott Wilson, 1 match, 2003 
Derek Wing, 9 matches, 1964–1986
Adrian Wykes, 3 matches, 1987–1989
Kenneth Yates, 1 match, 1964

References

Cambridgeshire County Cricket Club
Cambridgeshire